The White Angel is a 2007 Turkish drama film, written and directed by Mahsun Kırmızıgül, which follows the story of two Eastern youths who find themselves in a rest home after their father comes down with cancer.

Plot
Ali and Reşat bring their father Ahmet who is suffering from brain cancer for chemotherapy treatment in Istanbul. Unable to bear the treatment and thinking himself to be a burden, Ahmet runs away from the hospital and manages to reach a home for elders. The residents believe him to be abandoned by his children and take him in. Ali and Reşat find him but decide to let him stay when they see that  he is happy there. They learn the stories and backgrounds of each of the elders. Two of them, Yaşar and Nebahat have fallen in love and plan to get married. Ahmet arrangers for a big wedding and invites them to his home village in Diyarbakır for their honeymoon together with all the other elders.

Cast
Mahsun Kırmızıgül - Ali 
Arif Erkin Güzelbeyoğlu - Ahmet 
Yıldız Kenter - Melek
Nejat Uygur - Gazi Cemal
Yavuz Bingöl - Hıdır 
Erol Günaydın - Commander Vahit 
Sarp Apak - Reşat
Zeynep Tokuş - Nazlı 
Toron Karacaoğlu - Yorgo 
Salih Kalyon - Hacı 
Cezmi Baskın - Sabri
Lale Belkıs - Nebahat] 
Ali Sürmeli - Zeki
Tomris Oğuzalp - Suzan 
Fırat Tanış - Musa
Fadik Sevin Atasoy - Hatice
Necmi Yapıcı - Ömer 
Erol Demiröz - Laz İlhan 
Cihat Tamer - Huzurevi Müdürü Tayyar 
Nurşim Demir - Bakıcı 
Tanju Tuncel - Perihan
Hüseyin Avni Danyal - Selim 
Lale Tancı -  Sultan Hemşire 
Gazanfer Özcan - Palyaço 
Emel Sayın - Herself 
Suna Selen - Mızgin 
Bilge Zobu - Yaşar Hoca

Reception

Reviews
Today's Zaman reviewer M. Nedim Hazar states that the film contains, the East-West contradiction and a comparison of values. It brings the dominating force of the West -- the mind -- and that of the East -- the heart - face to face, but  doesn't take a folkloric approach to the East-West comparison as in Yılmaz Erdoğan's movies. Apart from this, it still falls into the marshland of exaggerated caricature-ization which seems to have "worked into the veins" of the celebrities who star in the film. Moviegoers might be fond of this, but it is still an important setback for a movie. He concludes it is a film, that will shock -- in a positive sense -- those whose expectations for the film are very low because of Kırmızıgül. It's also a movie that is very "presentable," whose language and message is very clear. In addition, it contains as much laughter and tears as any Yeşilçam movie does. It should be watched and applauded as a first film of a first-time director..

Awards
41st WorldFest-Houston International Film Festival (Huston): Remi Award.

References

External links
Official site
  Official Site
  International Site
  Persian Site
 

2007 films
2000s Turkish-language films
2007 directorial debut films
2007 drama films
Films set in Turkey
Turkish drama films
Films directed by Mahsun Kırmızıgül